Maxim Gorky was a Russian writer.

Maxim Gorky, Maxim Gorkiy or Maksim Gorkiy may also refer to:
Soviet cruiser Maxim Gorky, a Kirov-class cruiser
SS Maxim Gorkiy, a cruise ship formerly operated by Phoenix Reisen
Tupolev ANT-20 or Maxim Gorky, a propaganda aircraft
Maksim Gorkiy, Armenia or Bovadzor, a town in the Lori Province of Armenia
Maxim Gorky Fortresses, coastal batteries used by the Soviet Union in the Crimea during World War II
Maksim Gorkiy station, a station on the Chilonzor Line of the Tashkent Metro.